Yordan Yanchev (born 30 August 2001) is a Bulgarian swimmer. He competed in the men's 200 metre freestyle event at the 2018 FINA World Swimming Championships (25 m), in Hangzhou, China.

References

External links
 

2001 births
Living people
Bulgarian male freestyle swimmers
Place of birth missing (living people)
Swimmers at the 2018 Summer Youth Olympics
21st-century Bulgarian people